Gossypieae is a tribe of the flowering plant subfamily Malvoideae. It includes the cotton (Gossypium) and related plants. It is distinguished from the Hibisceae on the basis of embryo structure and its apparently unique possession of glands able to synthesize the pigment gossypol.

Genera 
The following genera are recognised. The Germplasm Resources Information Network (GRIN) differs in additionally including the genus Alyogyne and excluding the genus Thepparatia.
 Cephalohibiscus Ulbr.
 Cienfuegosia Cav.
 Gossypioides Skovst. ex J.B.Hutch.
 Gossypium L.
 Hampea Schltdl.
 Kokia Lewton
 Lebronnecia Fosberg
 Thepparatia Phuph.
 Thespesia Sol. ex Corrêa

References 

 
Rosid tribes